Kenneth K. S. Dadzie (10 September 1930 — 25 October 1995) was a Ghanaian diplomat. He served twice as the Ghanaian High Commissioner to the Court of St James's (UK) and was also the Secretary-General of the United Nations Conference on Trade and Development (UNCTAD) between 1986 and 1994.

Career
Dadzie joined the diplomatic service of the Gold Coast in 1952. He continued with the service after Ghana became an independent nation in 1957. He held several positions in the service and was seconded to senior positions within the United Nations Secretariat both in Geneva and New York.
 He has also served as Ghana's Permanent representative to the United Nations Office in Geneva. During that tenure, he also served as Ghana's ambassador to Austria and Switzerland.

He was appointed by Jerry Rawlings as Ghana's High Commissioner to the United Kingdom during the era of the Provisional National Defence Council in 1982 and continued in this position till the end of 1985. After retiring from UNCTAD in 1994, he was appointed by the Rawlings government as Ghana's High Commissioner to the UK once again.

UNCTAD
Dadzie became the Director-General for Development and International Economic Cooperation within UNCTAD between 1978 and 1982. He became the fifth Secretary-General of UNCTAD on 1 January 1986. He was the first African to serve in this capacity. He is credited by UNCTAD as having been influential during his time in office in securing the adoption of the Final Act of UNCTAD VII in Geneva which helped establish "consensus on international development cooperation thereby breaking through the barriers of the North-South divide." He was also instrumental in the organisation adopting a "New Partnership for Development" at UNCTAD VIII in 1992 in Cartagena, Colombia.

Death
Kenneth Dadzie died in London aged 65, after a stroke, while still serving as the Ghana High Commissioner to UK.  A special meeting of the Economic and Social Council was held during which tributes were paid to his immense contribution to the United Nations and especially UNCTAD.

See also
United Nations Conference on Trade and Development

References

1930 births
1995 deaths
Ambassadors of Ghana to Austria
Ambassadors of Ghana to Switzerland
High Commissioners of Ghana to the United Kingdom